"My Mammy" is an American popular song with music by Walter Donaldson and lyrics by Joe Young and Sam M. Lewis.

Though associated with Al Jolson, who performed the song very successfully, "My Mammy" was performed first in 1918 by William Frawley (later to become famous on I Love Lucy) as a vaudeville act. Saul Bornstein, the general manager in early 1921 for Irving Berlin Music Publishing, brought the song to Jolson's attention; Jolson first interpolated the song in January 1921 to the Broadway show Sinbad which was in the fourth year of its run. Jolson recorded this song twice and performed it in films, including The Jazz Singer (1927), The Singing Fool (1928) and Rose of Washington Square (1939). His voice can also be heard (dubbing actor Larry Parks) singing the song in The Jolson Story (1946).

The group The Happenings revived the song in 1967 with a recording that reached #13 on the Billboard Hot 100.  Around that same time, Liza Minnelli began to incorporate the song into her nightclub act; she would continue to perform "My Mammy" throughout her long concert career.  During their PopMart Tour of 1997–98, rock music band U2 would often quote the line "The sun shines east, the sun shines west, I know where the sun shines best" in performances of their song, "Miami". "The British rock band The Psychedelic Furs parodied it in their song "We Love You", singing "I would walk a million smiles for one of your miles". In the Broadway musical Thoroughly Modern Millie, the song is parodied in the song "Muqǐn". It is also parodied in the jukebox musical Our House (musical) in the song 'Rise and Fall' and 'The Sun and the Rain (Act II)'

Lyrics and interpretation
The song can be considered as a tribute sung by a man who, during his childhood, was nurtured by a mammy, a slave used surrogate mother, who supplanted the role that would have otherwise been provided by his biological mother. In the song, this person, now an adult, is returning to his aging mammy and proclaiming his unconditional love for her, hoping that despite her age she can still recognise him as her "little baby."

Recorded versions
The song "My Mammy" has been recorded by many artists, including:

John Arpin
William Frawley
Clive Baldwin
Eddie Cantor
Cher
Cameo
Brian Conley
Dion
The Everly Brothers
Eddie Fisher
The Happenings
Ted Heath
Al Jolson
Isham Jones
Jerry Lewis
Liza Minnelli
Norfolk Jazz & Jubilee Quartets
Tony Pastor
Peerless Quartet
Kenny Rogers (with Bobby Doyle)
Jimmy Roselli
Slappin' Mammys
Aileen Stanley
Pete Wending
Paul Whiteman Orchestra
Harry Yerkes
Lena Zavaroni

References 

1918 songs
Songs with music by Walter Donaldson
Pop standards
Al Jolson songs
Songs with lyrics by Joe Young (lyricist)
Eddie Cantor songs
Liza Minnelli songs
Music published by Bourne Co. Music Publishers
Anti-black racism in the United States